Aïn Defla (lit. oleander spring) is the capital city of Aïn Defla Province, Algeria. It is also a commune.

History
In Roman times the city was called Oppidum Novum. The vestiges of the Oppidum Novum are still visible.

The current city was founded in the 20th century by a soldier named youcef afg of the rank of agha, with the idea of bringing together the indigenous populations from the villages of the region.

This region of uneven terrain, which was considered unstable and dangerous by the French during the Algerian War, had for this reason been declared a forbidden zone.

In the 1990s, the same region was a stronghold of the Armed Islamic Group (GIA). There was fighting between militants and government troops in January 2021.

References

Communes of Aïn Defla Province
Province seats of Algeria